General Grange may refer to:

David E. Grange Jr. (1925–2022), U.S. Army lieutenant general
David L. Grange (born 1947), U.S. Army major general

See also
Pieter le Grange (born 1916), South African Air Force lieutenant general